Nicola Todeschini (born 18 April 1997) is a Swiss figure skater. He is the 2015 Swiss national senior champion and has reached the free skate at two ISU Championships.

As of August 2022, he competes for the Netherlands.

Personal life 
Nicola Todeschini was born on 18 April 1997 in Biel/Bienne, Switzerland. He lives in Sonvilier, Switzerland and in La Chaux-de-Fonds.

Career 
Todeschini was coached by Myriam Loriol-Oberwiler in Neuchâtel in the 2011–12 season. He was named in the Swiss team to the 2012 Winter Youth Olympics in Innsbruck, Austria, and finished tenth.

His Junior Grand Prix (JGP) debut came in the 2012–13 season. He was sent to the 2013 World Junior Championships in Milan but was eliminated after placing 33rd in the short program. Loriol-Oberwiler coached him until the end of the season. In March 2013, he traveled to Canada to receive coaching from Brian Orser during the off-season.

In 2013–14, Todeschini was coached by Didier Lucine in Annecy, France.
He won the senior bronze medal at the Swiss Championships but competed on the junior level internationally.

In 2014–15, Todeschini won the Swiss national senior title, in December 2014. Making his senior international debut, he placed sixth at the Bavarian Open in February 2015. In March, he competed at the 2015 World Junior Championships in Tallinn, Estonia. He qualified for the free skate by placing 19th in the short program and went on to finish 23rd overall.

In the 2015–16 season, Todeschini took silver behind Stéphane Walker at the Swiss Championships. He was selected to compete at the 2016 World Junior Championships in Debrecen, Hungary. He reached the free skate by placing 18th in the short program, and 22nd overall.

Programs

Competitive highlights 
CS: Challenger Series; JGP: Junior Grand Prix

For the Netherlands

For Switzerland

References

External links 
 

1997 births
Swiss male single skaters
Living people
People from Biel/Bienne
People from La Chaux-de-Fonds
Figure skaters at the 2012 Winter Youth Olympics
Sportspeople from the canton of Bern
20th-century Swiss people
21st-century Swiss people